Hungarian women's national under-17 football team represents Hungary in international youth football competitions.

Competitive record

FIFA U-17 Women's World Cup 

The team has never qualified for the  FIFA U-17 Women's World Cup

UEFA Women's Under-17 Championship 

The team has never qualified

See also
Hungary women's national football team

References

External links

U17
Youth football in Hungary
Women's national under-17 association football teams